Abbasi Mosque is a mosque located close to Derawar Fort in Yazman Tehsil, within the Cholistan Desert in Bahawalpur District, Punjab province of Pakistan.

History
It was built by Nawab Bahawal Khan in 1849.

See also
List of mosques in Pakistan

References

Bahawalpur (princely state)
1849 establishments in British India
Mosques in Punjab, Pakistan
Buildings and structures completed in 1849
Tourist attractions in Punjab, Pakistan
Buildings and structures in Bahawalpur District